The Cyprus Fire Service (Greek:) is the national firefighting service of Cyprus, with the principle task of undertaking of rescues from building rubble, the highlands, water bodies (sea, dams etc.), major traffic accidents, aviation accidents and fire disasters as well as firefighting on ships, aircraft, petroleum installations, buildings, rural areas, forest areas and chemical fires (HAZMAT)

History 
The first form of organized fire brigade was formed in the 1920s, on a primitive basis for today's standards, by the Municipalities of the city of Nicosia and Limassol. Firefighting, among other tasks, was undertaken by volunteers and employees of the municipalities. At the same time, in Nicosia, the “Police Fire Brigade” was formed to the standards of other British colonies of the time, with Police Officers being organised into firefighting groups, depending on the circumstances and the time.

In 1935 with the reorganization of the Police, the “Police Fire Brigade” was organized on a firmer basis, introducing new vehicles, permanent staff (that were serving as Police Special Constables and were specifically trained for the task) and with a fire station next to the Paphos Gate Police station, both of which exist at the same location today.
With the outbreak of the Second World War and the establishment of the British Department of Air Defence for the protection from air raids, firefighting teams were established in all cities. With the end of the war, fire stations were established in the towns of Limassol and Famagusta. Permanent Police Officers along with emergency personnel were manning the stations.

The Fire Service, in its present form, was launched in the mid-1950s, to meet the needs of the British that arose, due to the anti-colonial struggle of Cypriots and the developments in the Suez area. New Fire Stations were created in all cities with permanent staff and with the legislation which is in force until today, the "Cyprus Fire Service" was formed within the organizational structure of the police.

The Fire Service used to operate as an independent Division of Cyprus Police with its base in Nicosia but with national coverage since 1960. At 15/10/2021 the Cyprus Fire Service was established as an independent service and was separated from the organic structure of the Police.

Disaster Response Special Unit

History 
Although the formation of a special unit responding to disasters within the structure of the Fire Service was a concept that existed for several years, there were no significant steps made to implement it, but the large destructive earthquakes that struck Cyprus’ neighboring countries, Turkey and Greece in 1999, revealed the urgent need to create such a special unit for dealing with major disasters in the country.

So, on 2 April 2002, the Cyprus Fire Service, established or directly translated into Special Unit Dealing with Catastrophes, which is staffed by 50 firefighters from almost all districts of Cyprus. The unit is based in Kofinou due to the central location of this community, to allow easy access in the areas of Cyprus that are not occupied.

Training 
For the success of the Unit’s objectives the specialised training of the men is required, so the men of the Unit received training both in Cyprus and abroad. Courses in Cyprus mainly involved climbing and rappelling on steep areas to rescue people, classes to handle polytraumatic patients and rescuing people that were involved in traffic accidents. Unit members were also trained in countries abroad. Specifically in the U.S. and Singapore the men were trained in earthquake rescue and in Sweden they were trained on how to deal with chemical materials.

Number of elite members of the Unit also received specialised search and rescue Scuba diving training for sea, lakes and dams.

The Unit recently acquired a specialised rescue team, for earthquake or open spaces rescue, with the use of trained tracking dogs. The training took place in Cyprus from qualified instructors and the last stage of the program took place on the premises of the equivalent agency in Greece.

See also 
 Cypriot National Guard
 Cyprus Air Forces
 Cyprus Civil Defence
 Cyprus Joint Rescue Coordination Center
 Cyprus Navy
 Cyprus Police
 Cyprus Port & Marine Police
 List of fire departments

References

External links 
 Official website

Rescue agencies
Fire Service
Firefighting by country
Fire departments